is a Japanese athlete specialising in the long jump. He won a gold medal at the 2018 IAAF World U20 Championships. In addition, he finished fourth at the 2018 Asian Games.

Hashioka qualified for the 2020 Tokyo Olympics and finished in 6th place with a distance of 8.10m.

International competitions

References

1999 births
Living people
People from Saitama (city)
Sportspeople from Saitama Prefecture
Japanese male long jumpers
Asian Games competitors for Japan
Athletes (track and field) at the 2018 Asian Games
Universiade gold medalists in athletics (track and field)
Universiade gold medalists for Japan
Medalists at the 2019 Summer Universiade
Asian Athletics Championships winners
World Athletics U20 Championships winners
Japan Championships in Athletics winners
Athletes (track and field) at the 2020 Summer Olympics
Olympic athletes of Japan
20th-century Japanese people
21st-century Japanese people